Gehring is a German surname.  Notable people with the surname include:

 Franz Gehring (1838–1884), German writer on music
 Frederic Gehring (1903–1998), American Catholic priest and military chaplain
 Frederick Gehring (1925–2012), American mathematician 
 Georg Gehring (1903–1943), German Olympic wrestler
 Gillian Gehring (born 1941), British physicist
 Henry Gehring (1881–1912), American Major League Baseball pitcher
 Hanni Gehring (1926–2011), German cross-country skier
 Kai Gehring (born 1977), German politician
 Kai Gehring (footballer) (born 1988), German footballer
 Lana Gehring (born 1990), American short track speed skater
 Mary Gehring, American plant biologist and epigeneticist
 Rolf Gehring (born 1955), German tennis player
 Ted Gehring (1929–2000), American actor
 Viktor Gehring (1889–1978), German actor
 Walter Jakob Gehring (1939–2014), Swiss developmental biologist
 William Gehring (born 1962), American psychologist and academic

See also
 Gehring Clinic, a historic house and medical facility in Bethel, Maine, on the National Register of Historic Places
 Gehrig (surname)

German-language surnames
Surnames from given names